The Bangladesh women's national under-17 football team represents Bangladesh in international women's under-17 football in the AFC U-16 Women's Championship and the FIFA U-17 Women's World Cup. It is controlled by the Bangladesh Football Federation. They have qualified for the 2017 AFC U-16 Women's Championship in Thailand in September 2017. That is the 1st time, the team will play in the final round of this tournament after 2005 edition.

Team image

Home stadium
The Bangladesh women's national under-17 football team plays its home matches on the Bangabandhu National Stadium.

Results and fixtures

Legend

Since 2005 to present day all matches results are updated below in the table.

2005

2014

2016

2017

2018

2019

2022

2023

Coaching staff

Current coaching staff

Players

Current squad
 The following players were called up on 4 September 2019.

Captains

Krishna Rani Sarkar (2014–2017)

Honours
SAFF U-15 Women's Championship
Champion (1): 2017
SAFF U-15 Women's Championship
Runners-up (1) 2018, 2019
AFC U-14 Girls’ Regional (South and Central) Championship
Champion (2): 2015, 2016
Jockey CGI U-15 Youth Tournament
Champion (1): 2018

Competitive record

FIFA U-17 Women's World Cup

*Draws include knockout matches decided on penalty kicks.

AFC U-17 Women's Asian Cup

*Draws include knockout matches decided on penalty kicks.

AFC U-17 Women's Asian Cup qualification

SAFF U-17 Championship

*Draws include knockout matches decided on penalty kicks.

See also
Sport in Bangladesh
Football in Bangladesh
Women's football in Bangladesh
Bangladesh women's national football team
Bangladesh women's national under-20 football team

References

External links
Official website
FIFA profile

Asian women's national under-17 association football teams
under-17
under-17
Women's under-17